is a passenger railway station in the town of Naganohara, Gunma Prefecture, Japan, operated by East Japan Railway Company (JR East).

Lines
Gunma-Ōtsu Station is a station on the Agatsuma Line, and is located 44.2 rail kilometers from the opposing terminus of the line at Shibukawa Station.

Station layout
The station consists of a single side platform serving bidirectional traffic. The station is unattended.

History
Gunma-Ōtsu Station was opened on 7 March 1971. The station was absorbed into the JR East network upon the privatization of the Japanese National Railways (JNR) on 1 April 1987.

Surrounding area
 Naganohara Town Hall
 
 Naganohara Post Office

See also
 List of railway stations in Japan

External links

 JR East Station information 

Railway stations in Gunma Prefecture
Agatsuma Line
Stations of East Japan Railway Company
Railway stations in Japan opened in 1971
Naganohara, Gunma